Rev. Dr. Michael J. Coyner is a bishop in the United Methodist Church, the second-largest Protestant Christian denomination in the United States.

Biography
Coyner is from Anderson, Indiana.  He received his B.A. from Purdue University, his M. Div. from Duke Divinity School, and his D.Min. degree from Drew Theological Seminary (now Drew University).

Tenure as Bishop
Coyner was elected as bishop in 1996 and first served two terms in the Dakotas Episcopal Area.  In 2004 he was assigned to the Indiana Area where he is serving his third term.

Publications

Books
 Making a Good Move (Abingdon Press, 1999) 
 Prairie Wisdom (Abingdon Press, 2000)
 The Race to Reach Out (Abingdon Press, 2004)
 A Year With John Wesley and Our Methodist Values (Discipleship Resources, 2008) 
 The Andrew Paradigm: How to Be a Lead Follower of Jesus (2012 Abington Press)

References

External links
 http://www.umc.org/bishops/michael-coyner - Biographical sketch from the Council of Bishops.

See also
 List of bishops of the United Methodist Church

Living people
American United Methodist bishops
21st-century Methodist ministers
20th-century Methodist ministers
Year of birth missing (living people)
20th-century American clergy
21st-century American clergy